European BMX Championships is the main BMX sport championships in Europe. They are organised by the UEC, the European confederation for cycle sports.

Editions

Championships

2011/2012

Men

Women

2013

Men

Women

2014 
From 2014 multi-stage championships were replaced by one day championships. Although same format multi-stage European League were established, but the winner of the League do not hold the right to be named European champion.

2015

2016

2017
The 2017 European BMX Championships was held in Bordeaux, France, between 14 and 16 July 2017.

2018

The 2018 European BMX Championships was held in Glasgow, United Kingdom, between 10 and 11 August 2018.

2019

The 2019 European BMX Championships was held in Valmiera, Latvia, between 11 and 14 July 2019.

2021

The 2021 European BMX Championships was held in Heusden-Zolder, Belgium, between 8 and 11 July 2021.

2022

The 2022 European BMX Championships was held in Dessel, Belgium, between 8 and 10 July 2022.

Medals

See also
UCI BMX World Championships

References

 
European cycling championships
BMX competitions